Home and Away is an Australian soap opera. The following is a list of characters that first appeared in 2005, by order of appearance. They were all introduced by the show's series producer Julie McGuaran. The 18th season of Home and Away began airing on the Seven Network on 10 January 2005. The first introduction of year was Emily Perry as Eve Jacobsen. Issac Gorman arrived as Ryan Baker in March as did Sharni Vinson as Cassie Turner. Doug Scroope began playing Graham Walters in April. Ryan's mother, Amanda Vale, played by Holly Brisley debuted in June. Todd Lasance began playing Aden Jefferies in August and The Holden family consisting of widower Tony (Jon Sivewright) and his two sons Jack (Paul O'Brien) and Lucas (Rhys Wakefield) arrived in the same month.  James Mitchell began playing Jonah Abraham and Linden Wilkinson joined the serial as Mumma Rose in November.

Eve Jacobsen

Eve Jacobsen (also Zoe McCallister), played by Emily Perry, made her first appearance on 21 January 2005. Perry's casting was publicised in the 25–31 December 2004 issue of TV Week. She had previously appeared in Home and Away as an extra. One of the magazine's writers thought the regular role of nurse Zoe would prove to be Perry's "biggest break yet." Of her casting, she stated "When I read for Zoe and saw the character breakdown, I just had to have the role. It will be a lot of fun playing her."

Eve works as a nurse at a Psychiatric Institution and falls for one of her patients Sarah Lewis (Luisa Hastings-Edge). When Sarah's boyfriend, Felix Walters (Josh Lawson) dies of crystal meth overdose administered by Sarah, which she believes to be the result of a beating, she asks Eve to help her escape to get revenge. Sarah later shoots Noah Lawson (Beau Brady) dead before turning the gun on herself. Eve decides to take revenge on Summer Bay. She starts by murdering new Northern Districts hospital nurse Zoe McCallister and burning her body in a bushfire, before assuming her identity.

Eve then sets Noah's place alight, with his widow, Hayley (Bec Cartwright) still inside and plans further destruction by sabotaging a seaplane flight in order to kill the group on board but is only successfully in killing Benny Barron (Colin Borgonon), the pilot. She then frames Marc Edwards (Christopher Hobbs) for her crimes and begins targeting Sally Fletcher (Kate Ritchie) after she refers to Sarah as a psycho. Eve tries to kill Sally on two occasions but fails.

After a bomb threat at a murder mystery party is nullified, Marc is released on bail and works out that Eve is the stalker but she hits him over the head with a crowbar several times, killing him and then frames him once more. Eve continues playing more psychotic games by threatening another attack at the "Miss Groper" beauty pageant but she is only toying with the police. Detective Peter Baker (Nicholas Bishop) becomes convinced that Eve is Sarah returned from the dead and there is a confrontation at an abattoir. She begins playing further games with Peter and kidnaps Sally. Sally is rescued by the police before the building where she is held explodes with Eve inside.

Eve is later revealed to be alive and the body was that of Laura McPhearson, who disappeared on the same day Eve supposedly died. She continues baiting Peter and targets his apartment complex by moving in and assuming the identity of "Maxine Trood" (an anagram of "I Am Next Door"). She stages a bomb threat at the complex, forcing the area to be evacuated but it is only an alarm clock going off. Eve then sends a videotape to Jack Holden (Paul O'Brien) and Martha MacKenzie's (Jodi Gordon) engagement party and Peter is rattled. He solves the anagram but is still one step behind Eve. Peter receives an email telling him to arrive at the abandoned abattoir alone and he comes face to face with Eve but she overpowers him and tells him how she escaped the fire. Jack arrives on the scene and tackles Eve but she gets away. Peter and Jack separate in order to find her but Eve holds Jack over a balcony three stories above. Peter agrees to offer himself in exchange while Tracey Thompson (Sarah Enright) and several others circle behind and apprehend Eve. At the station, Peter tells her he has won but when he leaves the room she smirks, plotting revenge. Eve reappears at Jack and Martha's wedding and takes Tracey hostage and Peter bargains with her in the same manner he did for Jack but Tracey reveals she is Eve's accomplice. A gas explosion trigged by a cake with sparklers occurs and Eve and Tracey are killed instantly.

The Summer Bay Stalker storyline featuring Eve was nominated for "Best Storyline" at the 2006 Inside Soap Awards. Eve ruining Jack and Martha's wedding day was nominated for "Best Storyline" at the 2007 Inside Soap Awards. Eve also featured as part of Digital Spy's Serial Killer Poll in 2012.
Michael Idato of the Sydney Morning Herald hailed Eve's campaign of Terror against the Bay as "the storyline of the moment, discussed everywhere from the office canteen to the corridors of power." On Eve's revelation as the Summer Bay stalker, He opined "Of course, we knew all along. The clue? She was the only suspect not in the show's opening titles. Haven't you learnt your lessons? It's always the guest star." An Inside Soap reporter branded Eve plotting to blow up the murder mystery party a "bonkers – but nonetheless brilliant" storyline.

Ryan Baker

Ryan Baker, played by Issac Gorman, first appeared on 16 March 2005 and departed in 2007. He made guest returns in 2008 and 2009. Gorman previously guested on the serial as Riley Edwards in 2002.

Ryan arrives ahead of his father Dan's (Tim Campbell) wedding to Leah Patterson (Ada Nicodemou). He is pleasant to Leah in front of Dan but later makes his dislike of her known. He spills a drink on Leah and is frequently rude to her. Dan, oblivious to this, argues with Leah when she sends Ryan to his room. Ryan then fakes illness to stop Dan and Leah shopping for rings and is quickly exposed by Leah. As revenge, Ryan destroys Leah's wedding dress. The final straw for Ryan's bad behaviour comes when he burns the invitations after learning his mother Amanda Vale (Holly Brisley) is not invited. Leah's son VJ (Nicholas and Cameron Stevens) puts his hand in the ashes and burns himself. VJ's burns are mild but both Dan and Leah are furious with Ryan. He then packs his bags and runs away but is found on the wharf by his uncle Peter (Nicholas Bishop) who tells him Dan and Amanda will not be getting back together. Ryan then apologises to Dan and Leah and replaces the wedding invitations before returning to Amanda in America. Ryan returns for the wedding as a ring bearer.

Dan later decides Amanda is a bad influence on Ryan and has him move with him and Leah. However, after an argument with Dan, Amanda takes Ryan back to Los Angeles. Amanda returns with Ryan several months later and they settle in the bay into a mansion. They are joined by Belle Taylor (Jessica Tovey), Amanda's long-lost daughter and Ryan's half-sister. Ryan is happy when Amanda and Peter get engaged but after the marriage encounters difficulties he returns to live with Dan and Leah. Peter and Amanda reconcile and relocate to the city but Ryan remains with Dan and Leah. Dan gets a job in America and is keen for the whole family to move but Ryan makes it clear he does not want to leave and begins misbehaving. He admits he misses Amanda so Dan takes him to the city to live with her and Peter. When Dan dies in an abseiling accident while in America, Amanda and Ryan return for his memorial service. Ryan worries that Leah and VJ will not see him as part of their family but Leah reassures him that he always will be. Ryan and Amanda return for Belle's wedding to Aden Jefferies (Todd Lasance) and for Belle's last few hours before her death of cancer. They attend her funeral before returning home to the city.

For his portrayal of Ryan, Gorman was nominated for Best Young Actor at the 2006 Inside Soap Awards.

Cassie Turner

Cassie Turner, played by Sharni Vinson, debuted on-screen during the episode broadcast on 18 March 2005 and departed on 2 April 2008. Vinson previously appeared in 2001 and 2003, as guest characters named Tonya and Summer respectively. In 2004, Vinson's agent submitted her to audition for the role of Martha MacKenzie. Vinson received a re-call for the role and was also handed scripts for another character, Cassie Turner. However, fellow actress Jodi Gordon went on to secure the role of Martha. In July 2007, media outlets reported that Vinson wanted to quit the serial in order to pursue other projects in Los Angeles. That November, it was confirmed that Vinson had quit Home and Away so she could move to Los Angeles to be with her boyfriend. However, the serial refused to comment on her departure because Cassie would still be seen on-screen into 2008. Cassie has been described as having a "fiercely independent and headstrong" persona. While she is able to learn from her mistakes and has a knack when it comes to "winning friends and influencing people". For her portrayal of Cassie, Vinson as nominated in the category of "Most Popular New Female Talent" at the 2006 Logie Awards. A columnist for the Sunday Mirror said that Cassie "set pulses racing" and branded her a "sexy soap siren". They also opined that Vinson herself was a "sexy Home & Away starlet" and that her departure was "bad news" and "disappointing" for men who watch the serial.

Graham Walters
	
Graham Walters, played by Doug Scroope, made his first appearance on 22 April 2005 and departed following the character's death on 3 March 2006

Graeme arrives in Summer Bay for his grandson Robbie Hunter's (Jason Smith) 18th birthday. There is some visible tension between him and his daughter Beth (Clarissa House). Beth confronts Graham about his distant and aloof behaviour. He breaks down explaining that he had been deeply effected by his time in the Vietnam War and was left too scared to be close to anyone. He later sells his farm and attempts to build bridges with his daughter and grandchildren. Graham becomes attracted to the much younger Amanda Vale (Holly Brisley) (who previously dated his grandson Scott (Kip Gamblin). Amanda seduces him much to his family's disgust and he moves in with her. Beth voices her disapproval but Graham and Amanda marry much to the shock of the Bay.

It becomes clear Amanda is using Graham but he refuses to believe it but after she repeatedly makes excuses to avoid consummating the marriage and frequently dumping her son Ryan Baker (Isaac Gorman) on him he begins to see the light. Graham later discovers Amanda is seeing Josh West) (Daniel Collopy) and confronts her about it. He then enlists Morag Bellingham's (Cornelia Frances) help in exposing Josh's illegal Project 56. He confronts Amanda about it but suffers a heart attack in the process. Amanda phones for the ambulance but ultimately leaves Graham to die. He is rushed to hospital and pronounced brain dead. Amanda and Graham's family battle over switching off the life support machine. Robbie takes matters into his own hands and turns off the machine, ending Graham's life. Amanda inherits Graham's estate and holds a wake for him which people snub in favour of the Hunter family. Amanda later returns Graham's war medals to Beth and after Robbie confesses to turning the machine off, he stands trial and is found Guilty but is not imprisoned.

Diesel Williams
	
Diesel Williams, played by Marcus Jacommeti made his first appearance on 9 May 2005 and departed on 17 June 2005.

Diesel was Jacommetti's first acting role after completing Year 12 and he signed to the series for 20 episodes. In order to secure the role of Diesel, Jacometti had to commute from his hometown of Kingston, Tasmania to Sydney. He described his experience in an interview with a reporter from the Hobart Mercury; "It's the most awesome feeling, I find it hard watching myself on TV so far but I couldn't have asked for a better start. I was new to Sydney and I was driving around getting totally lost before the audition and I was running late". Jacommeti experienced nerves when first dealing with his fame; "A bus driver said 'hey, I know you, you're Diesel' and I just slunk out of there and caught another bus. It's weird, amazing." He described his castmates as being sincere and helpful. Jacometti talked about his character; "He falls in love with the wrong people, causes a bit of trouble and then gets out of there, I don't think we're alike but maybe his core is similar to mine."

Diesel arrives at Summer Bay High and is introduced to Sally Fletcher (Kate Ritchie) by principal Barry Hyde (Ivar Kants). His unconventional dress sense makes him a target for bully Jason Pappa (Joshua Biagi) and his friends who begin picking on him and when they discover he has a rose tattoo they assume he is gay. In order to dispel the rumours about his sexuality, Diesel begins dating Matilda Hunter (Indiana Evans) who is attracted with him. However, he tells Cassie Turner (Sharni Vinson) he is not interested in Matilda romantically. Jason sees through the smokescreen and continues to taunt Diesel and beats him up.

Sally offers to tutor Diesel and makes excuses as to why she cannot go over to his house. It is revealed Diesel is living rough after falling out with his foster parents and Sally invites him to live with her and her husband Flynn Saunders (Joel McIlroy) who is reluctant to have Diesel there. Diesel and Flynn do not get along. After Diesel reveals to Sally it is his mother's birthday and he used to take her for a meal, she agrees to go a restaurant with him much to Flynn's unease. Diesel moves out after Flynn lines up accommodation at a hostel.

Henry Hunter (Tobi Atkins) finds Diesel with a photo of Sally and Diesel tells him they are having an affair. During a tutoring session, Diesel kisses Sally, which is witnessed by Dan Baker (Tim Campbell). Sally rejects Diesel and he burns a sketch he drew of her. Diesel begins acting up in class and later alleges Sally has been sexually harassing him. The Allegations are soon all over town and Sally is suspended as a result. Ric Dalby (Mark Furze) and Cassie try to get Diesel to drop the allegations but it only exacerbates the situation. He tells Sally he will drop the complaint if she admits she loves him.

Diesel steals Sally's locket containing a photo of her and Flynn and fakes some emails allegedly from Sally to him. Carl Summons (John O'Hare), an investigator from the Education department interviews Diesel and he shows him the emails. When Carl asks Sally to show him her locket, a photo of Diesel is found and Sally is stood down from her position at the school. Barry threatens to make life difficult for Diesel if he does not admit the truth. Sally comes home to find Diesel holding her baby daughter Pippa hostage and threatens to harm her if Sally does not admit she loves him. Sally tries reasoning with him and he allows her to take a call from Flynn, who is alerted to the danger. Diesel works out what is going on and he tries to flee with Pippa but Flynn tackles him and Diesel is arrested. He confesses to Ken Harper (Mark McCann) about falsifying the allegations and framing Sally. Sally visits him and he tells her she reminds him of his mother. She tells him she knows what it is like to lose a parent but having an unhealthy fixation on someone is unacceptable. Diesel apologises and is taken away for psychiatric care.

Amanda Vale

Amanda Vale, played by Holly Brisley, made her first on-screen appearance on 30 June 2005 and departed in 2007. The character returned for a brief guest appearances in 2008 and 2009. Brisley reprised her role of Amanda in October 2007. She said "My character only moved to the city so she can flit in and flit out". In June 2009, it was announced that Brisley would be returning to Home and Away to take part in a secretive storyline. Brisley's real-life pregnancy was written into the scripts.  Amanda is described as the "ultimate attention-seeker", who manipulates people to get what she wants. For her portrayal of Amanda, Brisley was nominated in the "Best Bitch" category at the 2007 Inside Soap Awards.

Aden Jefferies

Aden Jefferies, played by Todd Lasance, debuted on-screen during the episode airing on 4 August 2005. Aden was introduced as a recurring character and as part of Cassie Turner's (Sharni Vinson) storylines. Lasance was offered the role after previously auditioning for a separate character. In 2007, Lasance was asked to return on another guest contract, though was promoted to the regular cast soon after. In 2005, Lasance auditioned for the role of Jack Holden; however, actor Paul O'Brien secured the role. The serial's producers called Lasance back, offering him the part of Aden, in a guest capacity Aden was brought into the serial to play a part of Cassie Turner's (Sharni Vinson) storylines. Lasance had not previously watched the serial, but upon learning of his part he said he watched it "religiously" and carried out research on the net. In April 2007, The Newcastle Herald announced that Lasance would return to filming with Home and Away.  In August 2009, TV Week reported that Lasance had quit Home and Away to pursue a career overseas when he signed with a Los Angeles talent agency. However, a spokesperson for the serial said there were no immediate plans for Lasance to be written out. His official departure was later made public and he filmed his final scenes on 15 January 2010. When Lasance returned to the serial in 2007, he described Aden as being "an absolute bad-arse". Lasance said that he did not want Aden to turn into a "good guy". Lasance was nominated in the category of "Best Bad Boy" at the 2008 Inside Soap Awards. Lasance won the award for "Most Popular Actor" at the 2009 Logie Awards, for his portrayal of Aden. He was nominated in the same category at the 2010 ceremony.

Jack Holden

Jack Holden, played by Paul O'Brien, made his first on-screen appearance on 5 August 2005 and departed on 28 November 2008. O'Brien earned various awards nominations for his portrayal of Jack. In 2006, O'Brien won a Logie Award for "Most Popular New Male Talent". The 2007 and 2008 ceremonies saw O'Brien nominated for "Most Popular Actor". At the 2007 Inside Soap Awards, O'Brien and co-star Jodi Gordon were nominated for "Best Storyline" for Jack and Martha's wedding day. The following year, O'Brien was nominated for "Best Actor", "Sexiest Male" and "Best Couple" with Gordon. At the first Digital Spy Soap Awards, O'Brien was nominated for "Best On-Screen Partnership" with Gordon.

Tony Holden

Tony Holden, played by Jon Sivewright, made his debut on-screen appearance during the episode broadcast on 5 August 2005 and departed on 11 August 2010. As of 2010 Sivewright was the joint second longest-serving current male cast member in the serial. In February 2010, it was announced that Sivewright was being written out of the serial following the departure of his co-star Amy Mathews. Tony's storylines have focused on his grief on losing his wife, girlfriend and child, he is described as a "family man" who puts them first. As of 2010 Sivewright was the joint-second longest serving male cast member. That year his co-star Mathews who plays on-screen wife Rachel Armstrong had quit the serial to pursue other projects and it was revealed that producers decided that it was the right time to write out Sivewright's character. The serial's official website describe Tony as suffering "great loss" throughout his life. They describe his persona stating: "Tony has great compassion and empathy for others, yet always looks at the big picture with a positive perspective on things." "Tony likes to keep fit, but does not mind a beer with the boys.."
Holy Soap recall Tony's most memorable scenes as being when he reversed his vasectomy so Rachel and he could have kids.

Lucas Holden

Lucas Holden played by Rhys Wakefield, made his first appearance on 5 August 2005 and departed on 14 February 2008. For his portrayal of Lucas, Wakefield was nominated for Most Popular New Male Talent at the 2006 Logie Awards. Of the character, a reporter for the Evening Chronicle said "Lucas is one of those teenagers who, when he sulks, looks like he's been sucking lemons for a week." The reporter added that Lucas was a "stroppy lad" and that when Tony told him to shut up, it was "a beautiful moment". In October 2007, Home and Away and the Seven Network were rapped by the ACMA for broadcasting "raunchy scenes" in G-rated episodes, following complaints from viewers. One such episode was 4358, which aired on 21 February 2007, and featured Belle and Lucas's decision to have sex. Some scenes shown saw the couple in bed together as they discussed what had happened between them. The regulator said "ACMA found that verbal references to sex and visual depictions of sexual behaviour contained in the episode were not brief or infrequent. It also considered that the programme's treatment of the theme of teenage sexuality was not very mild in impact. ACMA therefore determined that Seven incorrectly classified the programme G, and that it breached the code in relation to this broadcast."

Michael Abraham
		
Michael "Jonah" Abraham, played by James Mitchell, first appeared on 4 November 2005.

Mitchell joined the serial after graduating from NIDA in 2004. In spite of Early starts, he relished the opportunity and enjoyed the experience. "It was great, just to be working and to be part of it," he told Vince Ciccarello of the University of South Australia's publication, The Graduate. "Everyone involved is so dedicated to the craft. And they work so hard."

Jonah is the son of Mumma Rose (Linden Wilkinson), the head of a cult called "The Believers". The Believers influence Tasha Andrews (Isabel Lucas) into joining them. Mumma Rose believes that Tasha is the chosen one who is destined to have Jonah's baby and arranges for Jonah to impregnate her. He goes along with his mother's plans and kidnaps Tasha's friend Martha MacKenzie (Jodi Gordon) to prevent her from informing Tasha. Tasha is drugged and it is believed Jonah has raped her. Jonah rebels against his mother's beliefs and tries to flee with Tasha but they are caught by the group. The police eventually rescue them and arrest Mumma Rose and Jonah and imprison them.

The following year, Jonah is paroled and returns to Summer Bay under his birth name, Michael. It is revealed that Mumma Rose had adopted him at age five and named him Jonah, after her son who died in a car accident. Mumma Rose had been drugging and brainwashing Jonah all his life. The discovery of his sterility clears him of being Tasha's rapist as well as being drugged that night. Martha and Irene Roberts (Lynne McGranger) refuse to listen to him and try to drive him out of town. After selling the land the Believers previously lived on, he begins working for Bruce Campbell (Chris Haywood) as a farmhand. Martha spray paints "Evil" on Michael's van and he chases after her, but they fall into a mineshaft, forcing them to be trapped for the night. After the rescue, Martha denies her feelings and dates Lewis Rigg (Luke Carroll) but later kisses Michael and they sleep together.

Michael and Martha's relationship is not accepted at first but Michael proves himself to her.
There are testing times for the relationship when Martha wrestles with her feelings for her ex-husband Jack Holden (Paul O'Brien), who is now engaged to Sam Tolhurst (Jessica Chapnik). Michael's jealousy gets the best of him and he violently punches Jack one day. In spite of this, Martha agrees to leave town with Michael but he ends up leaving alone after he realises he will only be second best to Jack.

Mumma Rose

Mumma Rose (Real name Florence White), played by Linden Wilkinson, made her first appearance on 17 November 2005. The actress was in the show once, played a former character, Katherine Walker in 1996.

In an interview with The Sunday Times, Catholic Priest Toby Sherring spoke out against Several of the serial's storylines involving religion, including one where Mumma Rose convinces Tasha Andrews (Isabel Lucas) to join her cult the Believers. Sherring said: "Sometimes it is assumed that all churches operate like cults, who will steal away naive teenagers from their families, brainwash them with strange ideas and involve them in strange suicide pacts, or send them knocking on people's doors with predictions about the end of the world." He added: "Because religion in TV shows such as Home and Away is portrayed in this way, the media version is firstly more believable and secondly much more intriguing, although ultimately unappealing."

Mumma Rose is the leader of a cult called The Believers. She has her son, Jonah Abraham (James Mitchell) convince Tasha Andrews to join the group. Tasha's friends are sceptical about The Believers but she refuses to listen. Tasha's boyfriend, Robbie Hunter (Jason Smith) tries to get her to see sense but he is pushed into a river by Mumma Rose who delays the search by stealing Tasha's mobile, so she cannot call her friends. Robbie is found but unable to prove he had been pushed.

When Rebecca Tate (Janneke Arent) tries to warn Robbie about Mumma Rose's plans to make Tasha "The Chosen One" to carry Jonah's baby, Mumma Rose has her kidnapped and denies everything when the police arrive at the commune asking questions. Martha MacKenzie (Jodi Gordon) tells Mumma Rose she wants to join the Believers, a ruse in order to rescue Tasha. Martha's rescue attempt is foiled when she is spotted near the hatcher where Rebecca is held. Martha escapes but is unable to prove any evidence of the Believers taking Rebecca.

Mumma Rose engineers a plan for Jonah to impregnate Tasha by drugging them both. Neither have any recollection of the night before. When Jonah helps Tasha escape, they are captured and Mumma Rose arranges for a purification ceremony for Jonah and Tasha which involves the use of fire. Tasha quickly manages to turn the group against Mumma Rose by reminding them she is the chosen one and they attack her. The police arrive and arrest the believers but Mumma Rose flees into the night in a hidden car.

Some months later, Mumma Rose returns and tries various attempts to get Tasha back in her clutches but they fail. She manages to corner her and holds her and Martha hostage. Tasha is then taken to a remote location where Mumma Rose tries to get her to induce labour. Tasha tells her if she does not have a caesarean, the baby will die. Mumma Rose then arranges for Rachel Armstrong (Amy Mathews) to be kidnapped and threatens to cut Tasha open herself if she does not comply. Rachel tries to inject Mumma Rose with a sedative but gets Tasha instead. The police receive a tip-off from Nurse Julie Cooper (Lisa Hayson-Phillips) and Mumma Rose is arrested.

Mumma Rose escapes with the help of Charity Fernbrook (Charlotte Gregg) and snatches Tasha's newborn daughter, Ella Hunter and plans to cleanse the infant with fire. She is foiled when Charity has a change of heart and calls the police, who are followed by Tasha, Robbie, Martha and Irene Roberts (Lynne McGranger). A hostage situation occurs and Mumma Rose demands to talk to Tasha, who agrees to meet her. She then locks them all in the room. When officers Jack Holden (Paul O'Brien) and Lara Fitzgerald (Rebecca George) try to enter the room, a struggle ensues between Tasha and Mumma Rose, resulting in the latter falling out of the window clinging the ledge. Jack and Fitzy pull her to safety and arrest her. Mumma Rose is then admitted to a secure psychiatric facility.

A writer from the Daily Record, described Mumma Rose as "sinister".

Others

References

, 2005
, Home and Away